Longest field goals may refer to:

List of longest gridiron football field goals
List of longest NBA field goals, basketball